Eemeli Paronen (31 March 1879, Ruovesi – 23 November 1957) was a Finnish smallholder and politician. He was a Member of the Parliament of Finland from 1913 to 1916 and again from 1917 to 1918, representing the Social Democratic Party of Finland (SDP). He sided with the Reds during the Finnish Civil War in 1918 and fled to Soviet Russia after the defeat of the Red side. He returned to Finland in 1920 and was imprisoned for some time for his role on the losing side of the Civil War.

References

1879 births
1957 deaths
People from Ruovesi
People from Häme Province (Grand Duchy of Finland)
Social Democratic Party of Finland politicians
Members of the Parliament of Finland (1913–16)
Members of the Parliament of Finland (1917–19)
People of the Finnish Civil War (Red side)
Prisoners and detainees of Finland
Finnish expatriates in Russia
Finnish refugees
Refugees in Russia